During the 1996–97 English football season, Bristol City F.C. competed in the Football League Second Division.

Season summary
In the 1996–97 season, Bristol City finished in the play-off places but ended up losing to Brentford in the semi-finals. In December 1996, the Robins were involved in a Bristol derby against Bristol Rovers at Ashton Gate that was ruined by crowd violence where after the final whistle, the Bristol Rovers players were assaulted by City fans after Rovers fans spilled onto the pitch after Beadle's equaliser in injury-time. This led to the FA calling for evidence from the match officials and police officers and Bristol City were charged for failing to control the spectators. In March 1997, Jordan left and was replaced by John Ward as manager.

Final league table

Results
Bristol City's score comes first

Legend

Football League Second Division

Second Division play-offs

FA Cup

League Cup

Football League Trophy

Squad

References

Bristol City F.C. seasons
Bristol City